The Guangzhou Chow Tai Fook Finance Centre, also called East Tower, it is a  tall mixed-use skyscraper in Guangzhou, Guangdong, which was completed in October 2016. It is the tallest completed building in Guangzhou, the third-tallest in China, and the eighth-tallest in the world. The Guangzhou CTF Finance Centre has a total of 111 above ground and five below ground floors and houses a shopping mall, offices, apartments, and a hotel.

The Guangzhou CTF Finance Centre is situated on a  lot along Zhujiang East Road in Zhujiang New Town, Guangzhou's central business district. In that neighborhood, the skyscraper is located east of the central axis with an underground mall and connections to public transportation underneath it. The Guangzhou CTF Centre is part of the Guangzhou Twin Towers. The Guangzhou CTF Centre is therefore known as the "East Tower" as well.

Architecture 
The Guangzhou CTF Finance Centre consists of a skyscraper and an eight-floor podium, that is connected to the skyscraper. They are linked by outriggers and belt trusses, that are located exclusively on mechanical and refuge floors. The skyscraper has a total of four levels of steel outriggers and six sets of double-layer belt trusses. Smaller columns are in between the mega columns. They are thicker than usual to meet the Chinese seismic codes and they are supported by a mat and pad foundation. This foundation sits on relatively high bedrock.

The facade of the skyscraper is made out of glass and has vertical mullions, made out of white glazed terracotta. The mullions are projecting out from the windows to create shades. The windows are operable and there are vents between them and the terracotta. Aluminum fins are located next to the vents to protect them from the wind. White LEDs are integrated into the fins to light the terracotta at night. The terracotta mullions make the exterior of the building lighter. It was not possible to create the brightness of the building by using lighter glass, since the local environmental codes do not allow more reflective glass. More standard metal mullions would have created this effect as well, but architect Forth Bagley, who lead the design, said in an interview with CNN they had chosen consciously for terracotta "to inject into the architecture an indigenous craft, that was specific to Guangzhou as a city." Furthermore, he said about the design that the skyscraper was not only set apart from the surrounding towers "by virtue of its height [...], but also by its simplicity."

The shape of the Guangzhou CTF Finance Centre is defined by its mixed-usage: the different uses require different floor sizes and the building is shaped to accommodate those demands. Namely, the skyscraper has setbacks at points where the usage changes: the setbacks are located between the offices and the apartments, between the apartments and the hotel, and between the hotel and the crown of the building. The setbacks are angled and contain parapets with sky terraces. The top of the building is angled as well, but doesn't contain a sky terrace. The angled parapets point at the tops of various nearby tall buildings. Because of the setbacks, the building looks different from every angle.

Different techniques were used to make the Guangzhou CTF Finance Centre more environmentally friendly. For example, it has efficient chillers and the podium's roof features solar panels. Moreover, the heat from the condensers of the chillers is recovered. The office and retail parts of the Guangzhou CTF Finance Centre together received a LEED Gold certification in 2018 after having received a pre-certification in 2013.

Layout 
The below ground floors and the podium of the Guangzhou CTF Finance Centre feature a shopping mall and an underground parking facility with 1,705 spaces. The shopping mall is called "K11 Art Mall" and is owned by K11, a subsidiary of Chow Tai Fook Enterprises. It features a 4DX theater with eight rooms and occupies the entire eight-floor podium and two below ground floors. The base of the actual skyscraper is occupied by the office lobby, the entrance hall of the apartments and a part of the hotel. The Guangzhou CTF Finance Centre is connected to other nearby buildings through outdoor pedestrian bridges and to subway lines 3, 5, and APM through underground links.

The offices occupy the floors 7 through 66, but are interrupted by two mechanical floors. Next to the (GFA) of Class A office space, the office floors house a sky lobby and a 150-person auditorium. The office floors are owned by K11. 24 floors with a total of 355 serviced apartments are situated above another mechanical floor and a setback. The apartments were designed by Perception Design.

The highest sixteen floors are occupied by a hotel, that is separated from the apartments by another mechanical floor. It also features meeting spaces, a ballroom, an indoor pool and seven cafes and restaurants. The sky bar and restaurant on the 107th floor are partly situated on an outdoor terrace. Most of the interior of the hotel was designed by design firm Yabu Pushelberg. The setback above the hotel is covered with three terraces. The strong winds are not felt on those terraces because of the chiseled parapets.

Elevators 
The Guangzhou CTF Finance Centre has 95 elevators made by Hitachi, including two elevators that are the world's fastest. These two elevators are used to bring hotel guests from the entrance to the lobby. In May 2016, the elevators were first tested and reached the promised maximum speed. In September 2019, the elevator received a Guinness World Record title as the world's fastest.

To achieve their top speed, the elevators in the Guangzhou CTF Finance Centre use permanent magnet synchronous motors. The air pressure is adjusted in order to prevent ear blockages and the elevators have rollers to smoothen the ride. Besides the two fastest elevators, the building has 28 double-deck elevators (with speeds of 150–450 m/min.), 13 high-speed elevators (210–600 m/min.), and 52 medium- and low-speed elevators. The designers chose for double-deck elevators in order to minimize the number of elevator shafts. The offices, apartments, and the hotel all have separate elevators.

Development and construction 

The Guangzhou CTF Finance Centre was first meant to be similar to the Guangzhou International Finance Center, that is situated on the other side of the central axis of Zhujiang New Town, but it was decided to make the new skyscraper taller and to give it a different shape. The developer of the Guangzhou CTF Finance Centre, New World Development, which is a subsidiary of Chow Tai Fook Enterprises, held a competition to design the building. The American firm Kohn Pedersen Fox won the competition in 2009 and thus became the main architect. The Guangzhou Design Institute and Leigh & Orange became the architects of record and the British Arup Group was chosen to engineer the building. The groundbreaking took place on September 29, 2009 – about half a year after the designing process started. China State Construction Engineering was the contractor. The Guangzhou CTF Finance Centre was topped out in July 2014 and the cladding was finished by the end of 2015. In October 2016, the skyscraper was completed.

When construction started, it was scheduled to open in the first quarter of 2016. Moreover, it was estimated back then that the building would cost more than RMB10 billion (about US$1.5 billion as of September 2009).

See also

 Guangzhou International Finance Center
 List of tallest buildings in Guangzhou
 List of buildings with 100 floors or more

References

External links 

 Official website of shopping mall and office space
 Official website of hotel

Hotel buildings completed in 2016
Office buildings completed in 2016
Residential buildings completed in 2016
Residential skyscrapers in China
Shopping malls in Guangzhou
Skyscraper hotels in Guangzhou
Skyscraper office buildings in Guangzhou
Tianhe District
Skyscrapers in Guangzhou
Kohn Pedersen Fox buildings
New World Development
2016 establishments in China